Tension is a Taiwanese R&B, pop music, and a cappella group that consists of five members. The band was first signed by Shock Records, then signed by record label EMI Taiwan.

Members
 Jimmy Hung - Vocal Position: Tenor
 John Baik - Vocal Position: Bass
 Andy Lee - Vocal Position: Baritone
 Brian Fong - Vocal Position: Tenor
 Raymond Hu - Vocal Position: Baritone

Description
Tension is a Taiwanese R&B/pop group, signed by EMI Taiwan.  The band consists of 5 members - Brian Fong, John Baik, Jimmy Hung, Andy Lee, and Raymond Hu. They were discovered during a performance at a local bar in Los Angeles by Taiwanese artist/producer David Tao. A record contract was offered to them a few months after, which sent them all to Taiwan as one of the first Asian-American groups to hit the market. Their first record album, Smart released in 2001, sold over 200,000 copies in a few months, giving them the highest first-week album sales during its release. After their success of touring and promoting their first album, they headed back to the states to work on their second album. While Tension was recording their next album, a legal dispute was placed against their first record label, Shock Records, making the group place a hold on its production. Their second album, Gotta be Your Man, was released in 2003. Tension received Best Album and Best Hit Single at the Singapore awards, and they were nominated at Golden Melody Awards for Best Group. They signed with record label, EMI, for their 3rd album, Planet love, which was pushed for an early release a few months after. They also recorded a compilation album titled "Story".

Disbandment

As it was said in a TV show per Jimmy Hung, they have disbanded already. 2. After the disbandment, they still kept in close contact, though some of the members are in Taiwan and in America. The reason for the said disbandment was also stated by Jimmy Hung; he said that their music company, EMI wanted them to sing cover songs from Korean and Japanese boy bands which they did not agree on because almost all 5 of their members are composers. He also stated, the reason why they are in the music industry is to create original music and not use other music. In the end after their contract expired, they decided not to renew it, and continue pursuing their dream in a different way.

Discography

Smart (May 2001) 

 Once upon a time
 Smart 聰明
 Our Story 我們的故事
 Who are we
 When I fall in love
 Sorry 錯
 Good-bye My Love(piano bar jam)
 Irresistible
 Crazy about you
 Good-bye My Love(last dance jam)
 Good-bye My Love 先說再見
 One afternoon with Brian
 Friends 只做朋友
 Strange 壞女孩
 Our Story 我們的故事(A cappella)
 Thank you(interlude)
 I'll be with you

Gotta be your man (May 2003) 

 Round 1
 Challenge 挑戰
 She's Having My Baby
 Tell Me Why
 Gotta Be Your Man 做你的男人
 Every Step 一步一步
 Arigato
 One Minute 一分鐘
 I Need You So Bad
 One Life One Love
 My Angel 恆星
 Count off
 Amazing Grace 奇異恩典

Planet Love (Jan 2004) 
 Planet Love 愛 星球
 Love ATM 愛的提款機
 Two Moons 兩個月亮 
 She's the one 感情線
 Baby Girl
 Miss You
 Time Letter 時空信
 True Love 愛星球
 Always Love You 永遠愛你
 Goodbye 是明天的 Hello
 Baby Girl(Remix)

Story (Aug 2004)
 別想檔住我
 離歌
 我們的故事(A cappella)
 感情線
 壞女孩
 Arigato
 She's Having My Baby
 Tell Me Why 
 先說再見
 一分鐘
 恆星
 Goodbye 是明天的 Hello
 聰明
 跟著月亮慢慢走
 愛的提款機
 做你的男人
 愛你失去自己
 同一首歌
 挑戰
 只做朋友
 兩個月亮
 愛 星球
 I'll Be With You
 奇異恩典

Publication

Very tension
中/英文书
Published on:1 January 2003, 
Tension first confession of how they were formed and their initial journey and pursue in their music career with photos of their daily lives.

我們炫在一起
繁體中文书
Published on：11 February 2004, ISBN：9578034601

A record of the Tension's growth. Complete info on TENSION's childhood, family life, first love, music preference with precious childhood photos and Tension's confession to each other.

The content of the book is segregated into 4 parts:
 When we were kids
 When we were in love
 When we play music
 When we are together

Charitable events
Tension participated in the first Yellow Ribbon Charity Concert in Singapore in 2004. Brian specially recomposed the melody of "Tie a Yellow Ribbon Round the Ole Oak Tree" to A Capella version for the official launch of the Yellow Ribbon Project and Yellow Ribbon Fund on 2nd Oct 2004.

Endorsements
Doritos
PH Land (麗嬰房)

References

A cappella musical groups
Taiwanese boy bands
Musical groups established in 2001
Mandopop musical groups
Taiwanese Mandopop singer-songwriters
Chinese musical groups